Soumaïla Ouattara (born 4 July 1995) is a Burkinabè professional footballer who plays as defender for Danish 1st Division club Hobro IK and the Burkina Faso national team. He has been described as a player who is comfortable with using both of his feet.

Club career 
Ouattara began his career at ASF Bobo Dioulasso in 2014 in Burkina Faso. In 2015, he signed for Ivorian club SOA before returning to Burkina Faso with Rahimo a year later. In 2017, he moved to Ajax Cape Town. Over the course of one season at the club, he played a total of two matches. His debut match was a 2–1 loss to Maritzburg United on 5 January 2018, and his final match was a 1–0 loss to Cape Town City fifteen days later. At the end of the 2017–18 campaign, Ajax suffered relegation after being sanctioned for fielding an ineligible player. In the summer of 2018, Ouattara returned to his former club of Rahimo.

On 5 February 2021, Ouattara signed for Moroccan club Raja Casablanca on a contract lasting until 2024. The transfer fee was reportedly worth 16 million CFA francs. His debut came in a 1–0 loss to Hassania Agadir on 7 April 2021.

On 29 August 2021, Ouattara signed for fellow Moroccan club FUS Rabat.

International career 
Ouattara made his debut for Burkina Faso in a 1–0 friendly victory over Libya on 4 September 2019. His first competitive match was a 1–0 loss to Mali in the African Nations Championship on 16 January 2021.

Career statistics

International

Honours 
Rahimo

 Burkinabé Premier League: 2018–19
Coupe du Faso: 2019
Burkinabé SuperCup: 2020

References

External links 
 
 

1995 births
Living people
People from Bobo-Dioulasso
Burkinabé footballers
Burkina Faso international footballers
Association football defenders
Association football central defenders
Burkinabé Premier League players
South African Premier Division players
Rahimo FC players
Cape Town Spurs F.C. players
Raja CA players
Fath Union Sport players
Hobro IK players
Burkinabé expatriate footballers
Burkinabé expatriate sportspeople in Ivory Coast
Burkinabé expatriate sportspeople in South Africa
Burkinabé expatriate sportspeople in Morocco
Burkinabé expatriate sportspeople in Denmark
Expatriate footballers in Ivory Coast
Expatriate soccer players in South Africa
Expatriate footballers in Morocco
Expatriate men's footballers in Denmark
21st-century Burkinabé people
2021 Africa Cup of Nations players
Burkina Faso A' international footballers
2020 African Nations Championship players